Marianne Fersola (born January 16, 1992 in Santo Domingo) is a Dominican volleyball player, who plays as a Center. She was a member of the Women's National Team, who won the bronze medal with her native country at the 2008 NORCECA Girls' U18 Volleyball Continental Championship in Guaynabo, Puerto Rico wearing the number #4 jersey.

Clubs
  Mirador (2005–2006)
  Distrito Nacional (2006–2007)
  La Romana (2007–2008)
  Pueblo Nuevo (2008–2009)
  CAV Murcia 2005 (2009–2010)
  Mirador (2010–2012)
  Universidad César Vallejo (2012–2013)
  Igtisadchi Baku (2013–2014)
  Mirador (2014–2015)
  Cristo Rey (2017–2018)
  Tupac (2018–2019)
  Mirador (2018–2019)

Awards

National Team

Senior Team
 2009 Final Four Women's Cup -  Bronze Medal
 2010 Pan-American Cup -  Gold Medal
 2013 NORCECA Championship -  Silver Medal
 2014 Pan-American Cup -  Gold Medal
 2015 Pan-American Cup -  Silver Medal
 2015 Pan American Games -  Bronze Medal

Junior Team
 2008 NORCECA Girls Youth Continental Championship U-18 -  Bronze Medal
 2009 FIVB U20 Volleyball World Championship -  Silver Medal
 2011 Junior Pan-American Cup -  Silver Medal
 2012 U23 Pan-American Cup -  Gold Medal

Clubs
 2012–13 Peruvian League -  Champion, with Universidad César Vallejo
 2013–14 Azerbaijan Championship -  Bronze medal, with Igtisadchi Baku

References

External links
 FIVB Profile

1992 births
Living people
Place of birth missing (living people)
Dominican Republic women's volleyball players
Dominican Republic expatriate sportspeople in Spain
Igtisadchi Baku volleyball players
Volleyball players at the 2015 Pan American Games
Pan American Games bronze medalists for the Dominican Republic
Expatriate volleyball players in Spain
Middle blockers
Pan American Games medalists in volleyball
Central American and Caribbean Games gold medalists for the Dominican Republic
Competitors at the 2014 Central American and Caribbean Games
Expatriate volleyball players in Peru
Expatriate volleyball players in Azerbaijan
Dominican Republic expatriates in Peru
Central American and Caribbean Games medalists in volleyball
Medalists at the 2015 Pan American Games